The 1900 Olympic Croquet one-ball singles tournament was held over three rounds on 28 June 1900. Nine athletes from France competed. The event was won by Gaston Aumoitte, with Georges Johin taking second and Chrétien Waydelich third.

Background

This was the only appearance of the event at the Olympics; it was one of three croquet competitions in 1900.

Croquet was also one of the first Olympic sports open to women (only sailing had female competitors before croquet, due to that sport taking place earlier in 1900), with three of the nine players in this event being women.

Competition format

The competition was a three-round tournament. The top four players in the first round advanced to the second round; the top two in the second round moved on to the final.

Schedule

Results

First round

The first round eliminated five players, allowing four to advance. Four players, including two of the three women, did not finish the round. The third woman, Desprès, finished the round with 24 points but did not advance among the top four.

Second round

Waydelich and Blachère were eliminated in the second round. Waydelich, in third place, is now considered by the International Olympic Committee to be a bronze medalist.

Final

Gaston Aumoitte won the championship.

References

 De Wael, Herman. Herman's Full Olympians: "Croquet 1900". Accessed 10 January 2006.
 Mallon, Bill. "The First Two Women Olympians" in Citius, Altius, Fortius, Autumn 1995, No. 3, p. 38. Available in pdf format from the AAFLA .
 

Singles One